Dobaaraa, also stylized as 2:12, Hindi-language science fiction thriller film directed by Anurag Kashyap. The film stars Taapsee Pannu and Pavail Gulati.

Dobaaraa is an official remake of the 2018 Spanish film Mirage. It opened the London Indian Film Festival 2022 and was theatrically released on 19 August 2022 and opened to generally positive reviews from critics. However, the film was a box office bomb.

Plot
A woman gets an opportunity to save the life of a 12-year-old boy, who witnessed a death during a thunderstorm which happened 25 years ago, by getting connected through the television set during a similar storm in the present.

Cast
 Taapsee Pannu as Antara Awasthi/Dr. Antara Vasishth : Anay's Love Interest and Vikas's wife
 Pavail Gulati as Anay Anand : Antara's love interest
 Nassar as Dr. Sethupathi 
 Rahul Bhat as Vikas Awasthi : Antara's Husband
 Sukant Goel as Abhishek
 Saswata Chatterjee as Raja Ghosh
 Vidushi Mehra as Shikha Vats
 Himanshi Choudhry as Sheela
 Nidhi Singh as Bhavna Awasthi
 Madhurima Roy as Sarah Kunder : Vikas's Girlfriend
 Aarrian Sawant as Young Anay
 Myra Rajpal as Avanti Awasthi
 Shaurya Duggal as Young Abhishek
 Medini Kelamane as Rujuta Ghosh
 Priti Shroff as Hospital Nurse
 Rahul Tewari as Police Inspector

Soundtrack 

The music of the film is composed by Gaurav Chatterji and Shor Police. Lyrics are written by Hussain Haidry. The background score is composed by Shor Police.

Reception

Critical response 
Dobaaraa received positive reviews from critics with praise for the direction, screenplay and performances.

Rohit Vats of DNA India rated the film 5 out of 5 stars and wrote "Dobaaraa is fast, dark, exciting, disruptive and has a multi-layered storytelling". Rohit Bhatnagar of The Free Press Journal rated the film 4 out of 5 stars and wrote "Taapsee is a good performer but her monotony kills the mood, however, the plot is so interesting that you hardly get time to distract yourself". Amandeep Narang of ABP News rated the film 4 out of 5 stars and wrote "For a film like Dobaaraa, you have to have a kind of mathematical exactitude on how to cut between timelines, set a standard pace, keep the plot relatable, interlace the story with music, and Anurag Kashyap manages to do exactly that". A critic for Outlook India rated the film 4 out of 5 stars and wrote "Dobaaraa is an edge-of-the-seat, brainy remake, worth watching once". Rachana Dubey of The Times of India rated the film 3.5 out of 5 stars and wrote "Dobaaraa is an engaging thriller which is worth your time. This one needs all your attention, so go dive in". Zinia Bandyopadhyay of News 18 rated the film 3.5 out of 5 stars and wrote "Dobaaraa is a mad and whacky tale and is edge-of-the seat as a thriller. The film keeps you hooked, and thoroughly engaged, even with the constant back and forth in time".

Grace Cyril of India Today rated the film 3.5 out of 5 stars and wrote "Dobaaraa is the kind of film that will have the audience putting together a jigsaw puzzle as they leave the theatres. And when they’ve done so, they’ll realise that Dobaaraa is just another level". Pratikshya Mishra of The Quint rated the film 3.5 out of 5 stars and wrote "Dobaaraa delves into questions of consequences and the time-space continuum and through Taapsee Pannu’s extremely believable performance as the frazzled, yet determined, woman on a mission, the film remains gripping and entertaining". Namrata Thakker of Rediff rated the film 3.5 out of 5 stars and wrote "Dobaaraa may seem confusing if you aren't exposed to the time travel genre, but Anurag Kashyap's film makes it the right time to get acquainted with the genre". IANS of rated the film 3.5 out of 5 stars and wrote "Kashyap is able to both narrate a stellar story and flesh out his characters within two hours and 12 minutes".

Saibal Chatterjee of NDTV rated the film 3 out of 5 stars and wrote "Director Anurag Kashyap gets much of it right even when the going isn't entirely smooth". Deepa Gahlot of Scroll.in rated the film 3 out of 5 stars and wrote "Dobaaraa has a brisk pace, enough to guard against nit-picking. Kashyap’s version is actually more interesting and emotionally engaging than Mirage". Anna M. M. Vetticad of Firstpost rated the firm 2.5 out of 5 stars and wrote "Dobaaraa is moderately thrilling and in parts genuinely frightening, but lacks the rootedness and heft that has come to be associated with Anurag-ness". A critic for Pinkvilla rated the film 2 out of 5 stars and wrote "Dobaaraa lags behind on the chills and thrills that one expects of a time travel-based thriller and misses out on creating the edge-of-the-seat atmosphere".

Shubhra Gupta of The Indian Express rated the film 1.5 out of 5 stars and wrote "Dobaaraa comes off too choppy and muddled. It’s hard to keep track of the many things happening in the time zones the movie slips in and out of". Monika Rawal Kukreja of The Hindustan Times stated "Dobaaraa has a lot that's unsaid and needs to be understood and that's where the complicated and complex plot works". Anuj Kumar of The Hindu stated "While Taapsee is at the top of her game, Anurag skillfully executes a more perceptive draft of the original Spanish mystery drama".

Box office 
On its opening day the film collected only  crore at the domestic box office.

 the film collected  crore at the domestic box office.

References

External links
 

2022 films
2022 science fiction films
Indian science fiction films
2020s Hindi-language films
Indian remakes of Spanish films
Indian mystery drama films